Vladyslav Vitaliyovych Mazur (born 21 November 1996) is a Ukrainian athlete specialising in the long jump. He won a gold medal at the 2017 European U23 Championships.

His personal bests in the event are 8.07 metres outdoors (+1.3 m/s, Lutsk 2018) and 7.86 metres indoors (Nehvizdy 2018).

International competitions

References

1996 births
Living people
Ukrainian male long jumpers
People from Berdychiv
Athletes (track and field) at the 2020 Summer Olympics
Olympic athletes of Ukraine
Sportspeople from Zhytomyr Oblast